The Great Port of St. Petersburg or Port of St. Petersburg is a major seaport serving the city of St. Petersburg in northwest Russia. The port's water area is 164.6 km2 (630,000 square meters). Since 2011, the port has been under the authority of a state-owned enterprise (federal government agency), the Port Authority of the Great Port of St. Petersburg. This agency oversees commercial navigation in the seaport of St. Petersburg and beyond in the designated areas of responsibility of the Russian Federation.

History 
In 1869, Nikolay Putilov (1820–1880)—a Russian naval officer, mathematician, engineer, metallurgist, entrepreneur, co-founder of the Obukhov factory, and founder of the Putilov factory—began preparations for the Sea Port of St. Petersburg with a sea canal from Kronstadt to St. Petersburg. On June 13, 1874, Tsar Alexander II approved a provision "On the Temporary Administration of the St. Petersburg Sea."  The general direction of the channel was approved by Alexander on August 21 of the same year.  On October 26, a contract for the production of works and supplies on the St. Petersburg Canal was signed.  N. I. Putilov "with his comrades" received a contract order for the works.  After Putilov's sudden death, the project was completed by his companions  and S. P. Maksimovich, assisted by the Finland Swedish engineer . On May 15, 1885, the  channel was opened to the passage of ships, and a new Maritime Trade Port was opened.

Putilov was buried, at his request, on the bank of the Ekateringofka River on Gladky Island, commanding a view over his factory, his port, and the Morskoy Canal. A chapel by architect F. S. Kharlamov was erected on his grave. His remains were re-buried in the crypt of St. Nicholas Church in 1907, which was built by architect V. A. Kosyakov in 1901–06 on what is today Stachek Avenue. His grave was destroyed in 1951.

General information 
The central unit of the Great Port of St. Petersburg is located on and around the islands of the Neva River Delta, in the Nevsky Lip of the eastern part of the Gulf of Finland, an arm of the Baltic Sea. The port includes the berths for maritime trade; forest, fish and river ports; an oil terminal; shipbuilding, ship repair and other industries; a sea passenger terminal; a river passenger terminal; piers at Kronstadt and Lomonosov; and the Gorskaya and Bronka facilities. They are connected by an extensive system of channels and fairways. It is divided into four districts. The container terminal includes berths 82–87, and both container ships and roll-on/roll-off vessels are accepted for processing.

The first and second areas of the seaport are served by the New Port railway station, the third and fourth by the Avtovo railway station.  

The port fleet includes service and support vessels belonging to various organizations, including more than twenty tugs of various capacities, icebreakers, oil harvesters, water cannon, boat collectors, boaters, pilot boats, raid boats, fireboats, and barges.

Composition 
The Great Port of St. Petersburg includes:

 Pools:
 East
 Baroque
 Passenger
 Forest Maul Raid
 Coal Harbour
 Vasileostrovsk cargo port
 Berths in Kronstadt
 Berths in Lomonosov
 Bronka deepwater port

Operations 
Oil products, metals, forest products, containers, coal, ore, chemical cargoes, and scrap metal are loaded in the port of St. Petersburg. The cargo turnover in January–February 2016 amounted to 7.5 million tons, down 7.0% compared to the same period in 2015.

The main stevedoring companies operating in the port are the Seaport of St. Petersburg, NEVA-METALL, Baltic Bulker Terminal, Moby Dick LLC, St. Petersburg Petroleum Terminal, First Container Terminal, and Petrolesport.

References 

Ports and harbours of Russia
Transport in Saint Petersburg
Water transport in Russia